Henry Fillmore (December 3, 1881 – December 7, 1956) was an American musician, composer, publisher, and bandleader, best known for his many marches and screamers, a few of which he wrote for the Band of the Hour at the University of Miami in Coral Gables, Florida.

Early life and education
Fillmore was born in Cincinnati, Ohio as the eldest of five children. In his youth. he mastered piano, guitar, violin, flute, and slide trombone. He kept his trombone activities a secret at first, as his circumspect religious father James Henry Fillmore (1849–1936)—a composer of gospel songs, often in collaboration with Jessie Brown Pounds
—believed it an uncouth and sinful instrument. Henry's mother secretly bought a used trombone for him and obscured from Henry's father the son's learning to play the instrument.
Fillmore, whose relative Frederick Augustus Fillmore (1856–1925) was also a tune-composer for gospel songs, was a singer for his church choir as a boy.  He began composing at 18, with his first published march "Hingham", named after a line of brass instruments.

Fillmore entered the Cincinnati Conservatory of Music in 1901.

Personal life
After graduating from the Cincinnati Conservatory of Music, Fillmore traveled the United States as a circus bandmaster with his wife, an exotic vaudeville dancer named Mabel May Jones. They were married in St. Louis.

Career
During the 1920s, Fillmore was back in Cincinnati conducting the Shriners Temple Band, which he turned into one of the best marching bands in the country.

In 1938, Fillmore, after being advised by a physician that he had just a few months to live, retired to Miami, Florida. He went on, however, to prove the physician wrong, keeping an active schedule rehearsing high school bands in Florida and composing marches. Henry Fillmore Band Hall, the rehearsal hall for many of the University of Miami's performing groups, acquired its name as a tribute to Fillmore's work in the band genre. His march "Orange Bowl" was written for Miami's Band of the Hour. Uncle Henry, as Fillmore was affectionately known to the members of the Band of the Hour, also wrote the University of Miami's current official fight song – "Miami U How-De-Doo". His arrangement of "The Star-Spangled Banner" is performed by the Florida State University Marching Chiefs. His march "Men of Florida" was composed for the bands at the University of Florida. He was given an Honorary Doctorate of Music by the University of Miami in 1956 in recognition of his career. Fillmore lived out the rest of his days in South Florida.

Music

Fillmore wrote over 250 pieces and arranged orchestrations for hundreds more. He published under a variety of pseudonyms, including Gus Beans, Harold Bennett, Ray Hall, Harry Hartley, Al Hayes, and Henrietta Moore. Only the name Will Huff caused any issues, as another Will Huff composed marches and resided in Fillmore's state. Fillmore used many pseudonyms throughout his career and was worried that flooding the market with music published under "Henry Fillmore" would dissuade others from purchasing his music. His pseudonyms are associate with grade, or difficulty level, or genre. In a 1953 interview with Jack H. Mahan, Fillmore explained his pseudonym uses: "Harold Bennett" was easy and non-progressive, if you can play one, you can play them all. "Al Hayes" was a little more difficult. "Will Huff" was a duplicate composer (Fillmore's "Will Huff" was usually easy grade). "Henry Fillmore" could be the easiest marches or the most difficult. "Harry Hartley" are all solos; cornet, trombone, and baritone that are easy grade with no triple-tonguing or cadenzas. Solos under other names are just incidental. "Henrietta Moore" is all twilight songs.

While best known for march music and screamers, he also wrote waltzes, foxtrots, hymns, novelty numbers, and overtures. Fillmore's best-known compositions include:

 "The President's March" (1956)
 "The Footlifter" (1935)
 "Americans We" (1929)
 "Men of Ohio" (1921)
 "The Man of the Hour" (1924)
 "His Honor" (1934)
 "The Klaxon" (1930)
 "Lassus Trombone" (1915)
 "(We're) Men of Florida"
 "Military Escort March" (1923)
 "Mt. Healthy" (1916)
 "The Crosley March"
 "Noble Men" (1922)
 "Orange Bowl March" (1939)
 "Rolling Thunder March" (1916)
 "The Circus Bee" (1908)
 "King Karl King" (1957)

Fillmore gained fame as the "Father of the Trombone Smear", writing a series of 15 novelty tunes featuring trombone smears called "The Trombone Family". A number of these have a strong ragtime influence. The tunes have subtitles printed on the parts, some of which contain racial slurs. Many were advertised specifically to denigrate black people.  All of Fillmore's trombone rags are as follows:

 "Miss Trombone (A Slippery Rag)" (1908)
 "Teddy Trombone (A Brother to Miss Trombone)" (1911)
 "Lassus Trombone (The Cullud Valet to Miss Trombone)" (1915)
 "Pahson Trombone (Lassus Trombone's 'Ole Man')" (1916)
 "Sally Trombone (Pahson Trombone's Eldest Gal Some Crow)" (1917)
 "Slim Trombone (Sally Trombone's Cousin- the Jazzin' One Step Kid)" (1918)
 "Mose Trombone (He's Slim Trombone's Buddy)" (1919)
 "Shoutin' Liza Trombone (Mose Trombone's Ah-finity)" (1920) (Also known as "Hallelujah Trombone" for the quote from Handel's "Messiah")
 "Hot Trombone (He's Jes a Fren' ob Shoutin' Liza Trombone)" (1921)
 "Bones Trombone (He's Jes as Warm as Hot Trombone)" (1922)
 "Dusty Trombone" (1923)
 "Bull Trombone (A Cullud Toreador)" (1924)
 "Lucky Trombone" (1926)
 "Boss Trombone" (1929)
 "Ham Trombone" (1929)

Occasionally, as in "The Footlifter" credit, Fillmore wrote with the name Harold Bennett.

References

Further reading

External links 

 
 Fillmore on hutchcc.edu
 also see the Karl King Page (each of these "March Kings" wrote a march saluting the other)

1881 births
1956 deaths
American bandleaders
American male composers
American composers
American Disciples of Christ
Musicians from Cincinnati
University of Cincinnati – College-Conservatory of Music alumni
University of Miami alumni
University of Miami faculty
20th-century American male musicians